The Odd Fellows Building in Owensboro, Kentucky, also denoted DAOB 86, is a three-story building that was built in 1895.    It served historically as a professional building, as a clubhouse, and as a specialty store.  It is listed on the National Register of Historic Places.

It is one of the most complex buildings, architecturally, in downtown Owensboro, and includes eclectic Beaux Arts and Italian Renaissance Revival details.

The Odd Fellows chapter had membership of 125 men in 1895 when this building, with third floor lodge space for the chapter, was built.  The rest of the building has always been commercial, with the first floor as retail space and the second floor as office space.

It was listed onto the National Register in 1986 along with multiple other historic resources in Owensboro, as result of a multiple resources study.

References

Clubhouses on the National Register of Historic Places in Kentucky
Cultural infrastructure completed in 1895
Buildings and structures in Owensboro, Kentucky
Odd Fellows buildings in Kentucky
Beaux-Arts architecture in Kentucky
Renaissance Revival architecture in Kentucky
Italian Renaissance Revival architecture in the United States
National Register of Historic Places in Daviess County, Kentucky
1895 establishments in Kentucky